Francesco Caccianemici (16th century) was an Italian painter of the Renaissance period. He was born in Bologna, and trained under Primaticcio, whom he accompanied to work for the Court of King Francis I of France at Fontainebleau. He also worked there with Il Rosso.

References

16th-century Italian painters
Italian male painters
Painters from Bologna
Renaissance painters
Year of birth unknown
Year of death unknown